Euconomelus is a genus of true bugs belonging to the family Delphacidae.

The species of this genus are found in Europe.

Species:
 Euconomelus lepidus (Boheman, 1847)

References

Delphacidae